Peter Ebden (born 26 August 1982) is a New Zealand archer. He competed in the men's individual event at the 2000 Summer Olympics.

References

External links
 

1982 births
Living people
New Zealand male archers
Olympic archers of New Zealand
Archers at the 2000 Summer Olympics
Sportspeople from Bath, Somerset
Competitors at the 2001 World Games
21st-century New Zealand people